Vidar may refer to:

Víðarr, Norse god
Vidar, Markazi, a village in Markazi Province, Iran
Vidar class minesweeper
HNoMS Vidar, several vessels
SK Vidar, sports club
FK Vidar, sports club
IL Vidar, sports club (now a part of Malvik IL)